The Gandersheim Casket is a small Anglo-Saxon chest from the 8th century, now in the Herzog Anton Ulrich Museum in Braunschweig, Germany.

The panels of the casket are decorated with interlace carvings of animals, plants and abstract shapes. A runic inscription appears on the inner side of the lid.

References

Anglo-Saxon art
Anglo-Saxon runes
Runic inscriptions
Containers